The 1900 Nebraska Cornhuskers football team represented the University of Nebraska as an independent during the 1900 college football season. Led by first-year head coach Walter C. Booth, the Cornhuskers compiled a record of 6–1–1, excluding two exhibition games. Nebraska played home games at Antelope Field in Lincoln, Nebraska.

Booth replaced the departed Alonzo Edwin Branch to become Nebraska's ninth coach in 11 seasons of football. This was the first season the team was officially known as the "Cornhuskers", adopting the moniker after it was coined by Cy Sherman of the Nebraska State Journal.

Schedule

Coaching staff

Roster

Game summaries

Lincoln High

Nebraska again participated in a pre-season scrimmage against Lincoln High School, a 22–0 shutout victory.

Alumni game

For the first time, Nebraska football alumni faced its current roster in an exhibition game. The game ended in a 0–0 draw.

Iowa State

Booth's first game at Nebraska was a resounding 30–0 shutout of Iowa State in Lincoln.

Drake

A late touchdown and safety by Nebraska were the only points from either team on a windy afternoon in Lincoln.

at Kansas City Medics

at Tarkio

Just two days after playing in Kansas City, the Cornhuskers made their first trip to Tarkio. Nebraska scored an early touchdown that, despite protests from Tarkio and its supporters, remained the only score of the game. The final outcome was disputed strongly enough in Tarkio that the home town newspaper reported the score as a 0–0 draw. This was the final meeting between Tarkio and Nebraska.

at Missouri

Nebraska defeated Missouri 12–0 in Columbia, extending NU's shutout streak to five games.

Grinnell

Nebraska dominated Grinnell, whose only chance to score came late in the game and resulted in a missed field goal.

at Kansas

Nebraska closed out its seventh consecutive shutout with a 12–0 victory over Kansas in Lawrence.

Minnesota

Nebraska's unbeaten run came to an end as the Cornhuskers hosted Minnesota in the first game of what would later become a frequent rivalry. The Gophers were a national powerhouse at the time, and the 12 points scored by Nebraska were more than all other Golden Gophers opponents in 1900 combined.

References

Nebraska
Nebraska Cornhuskers football seasons
Nebraska Cornhuskers football